Irina Florianovna Zhdanovich (Belarusian: Ірына Фларыянаўна Ждановіч, October 10, 1906 — December 3, 1994) was a Soviet and Belarusian actress. She received numerous distinctions including the People's Artist of the Byelorussian Soviet Socialist Republic in 1940 and Stalin Prize in 1948.

Biography
She was born in Minsk, Russian Empire (now Belarus). She was married to Boris Platonov.

Zhdanovich was a member of the Communist Party of the Soviet Union from 1947 to 1991. She was also a deputy of the Supreme Soviet of the BSSR in its second and fourth convocations.

She died on December 3, 1999 and was buried in the Eastern Cemetery in Minsk.

Career
In 1920, Zhdanovich opened the Belarusian State Theater, now named Janka Kupala National Theatre, the first state theater in Belarus. On the day of the theater's opening, she played the lead role in Lynx, based on Eliza Orzeszkowa's W zimowy wieczór.

Zhdanovich has acted in numerous plays at the theater including Marylka in Kuźma Čorny's Fatherland, Vera in Maxim Gorky's The Last Ones, Nastya in Eduard Samuylenok's The Death of the Wolf, Anya in Arkady Movzon's Constantine Zaslonov, Negina in Alexander Ostrovsky's Talents and Admirers, and Nora in Henrik Ibsen's A Doll's House.

Zhdanovich played the role of priest at the execution in Kastus Kalinovskiy, a biopic film directed by Vladimir Gardin.

Awards
Zhdanovich has won several awards and distinctions for her work. In 1940, she was named the People's Artist of the Byelorussian Soviet Socialist Republic. Zhdanovich has also received two Orders of Lenin and the Order of the Red Banner of Labour.

She was the recipient of the Stalin Prize in 1948 for her role as Anya in Constantine Zaslonov.

References

1906 births
1994 deaths
20th-century Belarusian actresses
Actors from Minsk
People from Minsky Uyezd
Communist Party of the Soviet Union members
Members of the Supreme Soviet of the Byelorussian SSR (1947–1950)
Members of the Supreme Soviet of the Byelorussian SSR (1951–1954)
Members of the Supreme Soviet of the Byelorussian SSR (1955–1959)
People's Artists of the Byelorussian Soviet Socialist Republic
Stalin Prize winners
Recipients of the Order of Lenin
Recipients of the Order of the Red Banner of Labour
Belarusian stage actresses
Soviet stage actresses